Pavlo Khazan (born November 17, 1974) is a Ukrainian ecologist, who was elected vice-chair of the Green Party of Ukraine in March 2009. He is also campaign leader at Friends of the Earth Ukraine.

Khazan established a non-governmental organisation, the National Defense Foundation, to support Ukrainian soldiers fighting in the War in Donbass. He was also involved in organising a series of rallies against former Ukrainian president against Viktor Yanukovych.

Career 
Since 1991, as a member of the environmental movement, Pavlo Khazan has participated in international campaigns Friends of the Earth, Sustainable Use Resources in Europe, Energy Alternatives for Sustainable Europe. In 1994, he founded the "Youth Ecological League of the Dnipro".

In 1996-2015, he was engaged in research in the field of sustainable development, renewable energy sources, environmental monitoring, mathematical modeling, development of waste management programs at the Institute of Ecology of the National Academy of Sciences of Ukraine.

He was an expert in energy and green economy projects in collaboration with the British Council and the Deutsche Gesellschaft für Internationale Zusammenarbeit.

Khazan led public campaigns, including one against the spread of shale gas (gas of compacted sandstones) in Ukraine in cooperation with Milieudefensie and Friends of the Earth.

He criticized Shell for a dangerous project to produce shale gas in Yuzivska gas field.

References

External links
 

Living people
Politicians from Dnipro
Ukrainian ecologists
1974 births